The Mémorial de la France combattante (Memorial to Fighting France) is the most important memorial to French fighters of World War II (1939–1945). It is situated below Fort Mont-Valérien in Suresnes, in the western suburbs of Paris. It commemorates members of the armed forces from France and the colonies, and members of the French Resistance. Fifteen representative French fighters were buried here in an elaborate ceremony on 11 November 1945. The present memorial was opened on 18 June 1960. It has a wall in which are set sixteen bronze reliefs that represent in allegorical terms the different phases, places and participants in the struggle.

At first the memorial made no reference to the victims who had been executed at the Fort Mont-Valérien, which had been frequently used by German forces to execute resistance fighters and hostages. Later a remembrance path was opened linking the crypt to the nearby clearing where the shootings occurred. The memorial is often the site of ceremonies related to World War II.

Background

Mont-Valérien was the site of a medieval hermitage and a popular place of pilgrimage from the 17th to 19th centuries. Fort Mont-Valérien was built in the mid-19th century, one of the forts guarding the perimeter of Paris. It is located in Suresnes on top of Mont Valérien. During World War II the Germans used Fort Mont-Valérien as a place where they executed members of the resistance and hostages. The bodies of the fusillés were then dispersed in the cemeteries of Paris. More than a thousand victims have been identified.

On 1 November 1944 General Charles de Gaulle paid tribute to the members of the Resistance who had died. He first visited the clearing at Mont-Valérien, then visited Fort Neuf de Vincennes, another location where prisoners were shot in Paris, and finally visited the cemetery of Ivry-sur-Seine, the main place where the victims of shooting in the Ile-de-France were buried. In 1945 de Gaulle decided to make a memorial to World War II at Mont-Valérien. The monument was not to be a tribute to the victims of war, but to honor those who had refused to yield, the war heroes. It was to present the members of the resistance as members of the armed forces, as representatives of the eternal France, and not as factional revolutionaries from marginal groups.

De Gaulle held a ceremony at Fort Mont-Valérien on 18 June 1945 with 200 Companions of the Liberation, honoring those killed during the war. On 11 November 1945 the bodies of 15 fighters were buried at the site in an old casemate that had been converted into a temporary crypt. They include nine combatants, three members of the Resistance and three deportees. In the ceremony General de Gaulle was preceded by torchbearers when he came into the fort. Accompanied by Admiral Georges Thierry d'Argenlieu he entered the casemate where the victims had awaited execution, then lit the eternal flame outside, the symbol of the Resistance. The inauguration ceremony and the original monument made no reference to the fusillés who had been executed at Mont-Valérien during the war.

Construction

When he again became President of the French Republic after the May 1958 crisis in Algeria, General de Gaulle decided to create a memorial to Fighting France. Félix Brunau, inspector general of public buildings and palaces, was charged with the task by presidential decree of 24 November 1958. The intent was to represent different aspects of the fight, including the phases of the war, the locations where fighting occurred and the branches of the armed forces and the resistance that were involved.

The esplanade has been named the Place Abbé Franz Stock. Franz Stock cared for the condemned prisoners while they were held in the fort, and recorded many of the executions in his diary.

On 2 November 1959 a ceremony was held in which a sandstone slab was laid in the center of the clearing dedicated to those who had been shot. During the night of 17 June 1960 the coffins of sixteen fighters were transferred from the old casemate to the crypt in the new monument, each coffin accompanied by six torch bearers. An empty tomb was reserved for the last Companion of the Liberation. The next day President de Gaulle formally inaugurated the memorial.

The cross is essentially a Gaullist symbol. There are two bronze doors under the cross. One leads to the burial crypt, carved into the rock. The other gives access to the stairway that leads to the remembrance path. At the base of the Cross of Lorraine an inscription gives part of de Gaulle's speech of 18 June 1940: "Quoiqu'il arrive la flamme de la résistance ne s'éteindre pas" ("Whatever happens, the flame of the resistance will not be extinguished.")

Raymond Triboulet, Minister of Veterans Affairs inaugurated the remembrance path in 1962. It retraces the path of the fusillés from the chapel, where the execution poles are kept, to the clearing. The pathway to the clearing, which has important symbolism to the communists, attempted to reconcile the very different political views of Gaullists and Communists. On 3 March 1998 a commission was established to pay tribute to the fusillés at Mont Valérien. On 20 September 2003 Prime Minister Jean-Pierre Raffarin inaugurated a monument to the memory of the fusillés, bearing the names of those members of the resistance and hostages who have been identified. The monument is the work of the sculptor Pascal Convert, and has the form of a bronze bell. There is a museum that presents the history of the memorial in the room next to the crypt. The memorial and the esplanade continue to be used for many ceremonies.

Crypt

The cenotaphs in the crypt are arranged in an arc and covered with the tricolor, surrounding the urn containing the ashes of unknown deportees. 

On the tympanum of the nave there is the sentence: "We are here to testify before history that from 1939 to 1945 her sons fought for France to live free." 

The urn is embellished with a metal sculpture representing a flame.

Henri Frenay was charged in 1945 with organizing the ceremony and selecting those to be buried to represent a broad spectrum of those engaged in the struggle.
The fifteen included casualties in Italy and Egypt, members of the marine and the airforce, colonial troops from Morocco, Tunisia and Senegal, and the deported resistance fighters Renée Levy and Raymond Bigosse. Levy may have been chosen as a gesture to the sufferings of the Jewish people in France during the war, but was primarily chosen to represent the Resistance.
Levy, the granddaughter of the former Chief Rabbi Alfred Lévy, was chosen at the insistence of Adolphe Caen. To the Jews the ceremony of 11 November 1945 symbolized that after their rejection during the Vichy era they had now been re-accepted as members of the French community.

A sixteenth body was added on 9 March 1952 in vault 2 to commemorate victims of the fighting in the Far East.

On 26 April 1954 an urn was deposited in the vault holding ashes taken from concentration camps.

Vault 9 was originally left empty and reserved for the last living Companion of the Liberation. Upon the death of the second before last in November 2020, it became Hubert Germain, who died in October 2021 aged 101; he was buried there on 11 November 2021 (Remembrance Day).

The tombs contain:

Sculptures

The 16 sculptures, each by different sculptors, are arranged in groups of 8 on each side of the Cross of Lorraine.

They are:

References

Sources

World War II memorials in France
Suresnes